The Marubi Palace Gardens Range Rear Lighthouse is located in the Marubi Palace Gardens in Stone Town, Zanzibar, Tanzania. The lighthouse is located to support ships trying to dock at the Stone Town harbor.

See also
List of lighthouses in Tanzania

References

External links 
 Tanzania Ports Authority

Lighthouses in Tanzania
Buildings and structures in Zanzibar